The 2022 Japan Open (officially known as the Daihatsu Yonex Japan Open Badminton Championships 2022) was a badminton tournament which took place at Maruzen Intec Arena Osaka in Osaka, Japan, from 30 August to 4 September 2022 and had a total purse of $750,000.

Tournament 
The 2022 Japan Open was the sixteenth tournament of the 2022 BWF World Tour and also part of the Japan Open championships, which had been held since 1977. This tournament was organized by the Nippon Badminton Association with sanction from the BWF.

Venue 
This international tournament was held at Maruzen Intec Arena Osaka in Osaka, Japan.

Point distribution 
Below is the point distribution table for each phase of the tournament based on the BWF points system for the BWF World Tour Super 750 event.

Prize pool 
The total prize money was US$750,000 with the distribution of the prize money in accordance with BWF regulations.

Men's singles

Seeds 

 Viktor Axelsen (withdrew)
 Kento Momota (first round)
 Anders Antonsen (semi-finals)
 Chou Tien-chen (final)
 Lee Zii Jia (first round)
 Anthony Sinisuka Ginting (withdrew)
 Jonatan Christie (second round)
 Loh Kean Yew (second round)

Finals

Top half

Section 1

Section 2

Bottom half

Section 3

Section 4

Women's singles

Seeds 

 Akane Yamaguchi (champion)
 Tai Tzu-ying (semi-finals)
 An Se-young (final)
 Chen Yufei (semi-finals)
 Carolina Marín (quarter-finals)
 Nozomi Okuhara (withdrew)
 P. V. Sindhu (withdrew)
 Ratchanok Intanon (quarter-finals)

Finals

Top half

Section 1

Section 2

Bottom half

Section 3

Section 4

Men's doubles

Seeds 

 Marcus Fernaldi Gideon / Kevin Sanjaya Sukamuljo (second round)
 Takuro Hoki / Yugo Kobayashi (first round)
 Mohammad Ahsan / Hendra Setiawan (second round)
 Lee Yang / Wang Chi-lin (second round)
 Fajar Alfian / Muhammad Rian Ardianto (quarter-finals)
 Aaron Chia / Soh Wooi Yik (withdrew)
 Kim Astrup / Anders Skaarup Rasmussen (final)
 Ong Yew Sin / Teo Ee Yi (quarter-finals)

Finals

Top half

Section 1

Section 2

Bottom half

Section 3

Section 4

Women's doubles

Seeds 

 Chen Qingchen / Jia Yifan (semi-finals)
 Yuki Fukushima / Sayaka Hirota (withdrew)
 Lee So-hee / Shin Seung-chan (first round)
 Kim So-yeong / Kong Hee-yong (semi-finals)
 Nami Matsuyama / Chiharu Shida (first round)
 Mayu Matsumoto / Wakana Nagahara (quarter-finals)
 Jongkolphan Kititharakul / Rawinda Prajongjai (quarter-finals)
 Apriyani Rahayu / Siti Fadia Silva Ramadhanti (quarter-finals)

Finals

Top half

Section 1

Section 2

Bottom half

Section 3

Section 4

Mixed doubles

Seeds 

 Zheng Siwei / Huang Yaqiong (semi-finals)
 Dechapol Puavaranukroh / Sapsiree Taerattanachai (champions)
 Yuta Watanabe / Arisa Higashino (final)
 Wang Yilyu / Huang Dongping (semi-finals)
 Tang Chun Man / Tse Ying Suet (quarter-finals)
 Thom Gicquel / Delphine Delrue (second round)
 Tan Kian Meng / Lai Pei Jing (quarter-finals)
 Mark Lamsfuß / Isabel Lohau (first round)

Finals

Top half

Section 1

Section 2

Bottom half

Section 3

Section 4

References

External links 
 Tournament Link

Japan Open (badminton)
Japan Open
Japan Open (badminton)
Japan Open (badminton)
Japan Open (badminton)